Vadim Pereskokov (born 27 August 1993) is a Russian professional ice hockey forward currently playing for HK Dukla Michalovce of the Slovak Extraliga.

Playing career

He previously played with Admiral Vladivostok with whom he joined after a brief stint with Lahti Pelicans of the Finnish Liiga. He formerly played for HC Kunlun Red Star of the Kontinental Hockey League.

On July 5, 2018, Pereskokov was traded in the off-season by Admiral to HC Spartak Moscow in exchange for Ville Pokka.

Career statistics

Regular season and playoffs

References

External links
 

1993 births
Admiral Vladivostok players
HC CSKA Moscow players
HC Košice players
HC Kunlun Red Star players
Lahti Pelicans players
Lausanne HC players
Living people
Mikkelin Jukurit players
Russian ice hockey forwards
Torpedo Nizhny Novgorod players
Amur Khabarovsk players
HK Dukla Michalovce players
Russian expatriate sportspeople in China
Russian expatriate sportspeople in Finland
Russian expatriate sportspeople in Switzerland
Russian expatriate sportspeople in Slovakia
Expatriate ice hockey players in Slovakia
Expatriate ice hockey players in China
Expatriate ice hockey players in Switzerland
Expatriate ice hockey players in Finland
Russian expatriate ice hockey people